Ashcherinsky karyer is a rural locality (a settlement) in Klyazminskoye Rural Settlement, Kovrovsky District, Vladimir Oblast, Russia. The population was 30 as of 2010.

Geography 
Ashcherinsky karyer is located 11 km east of Kovrov (the district's administrative centre) by road. Gostyukhino is the nearest rural locality.

References 

Rural localities in Kovrovsky District